Joe Meli (born March 20, 1956, in Lethbridge, Alberta) is a retired judoka from Canada, who represented his native country at three Summer Olympics: 1976, 1984 and 1988. He won the bronze medal at the 1979 Pan American Games in the men's open class division. In 1986, he won the silver medal in the 95 kg weight category at the judo demonstration sport event as part of the 1986 Commonwealth Games.

See also
Judo in Alberta
Judo in Canada
List of Canadian judoka

References

1956 births
Canadian male judoka
Judoka at the 1976 Summer Olympics
Judoka at the 1984 Summer Olympics
Judoka at the 1988 Summer Olympics
Living people
Olympic judoka of Canada
Sportspeople from Lethbridge
Pan American Games bronze medalists for Canada
Pan American Games medalists in judo
Judoka at the 1979 Pan American Games
Medalists at the 1979 Pan American Games
21st-century Canadian people
20th-century Canadian people